Hillcrest is a neighborhood in San Diego, California lying northwest of  Balboa Park and south of Mission Valley.

Hillcrest is known for its "tolerance and acceptance," its gender diversity, and locally owned businesses, including restaurants, cafés, bars, clubs, trendy thrift-stores, and other independent specialty stores. Hillcrest has a high population density compared to many other neighborhoods in San Diego, and it has a large and active lesbian, gay, bisexual, transgender, and polyamorous community.

Geography 
Hillcrest is an older neighborhood which has gone through gentrification. Many streets are lined with trees. There are Craftsman homes and Mid-Century modern condominium buildings.

The neighborhood is bounded by Mission Hills to the northwest, Bankers Hill and Balboa Park to the south, University Heights to the north, and North Park to the east. A large ridge overlooking San Diego Bay borders the neighborhood to the west.

Hillcrest is part of the Uptown community planning area, which consists of the neighborhoods of Mission Hills, Hillcrest, Bankers Hill, Park West, and University Heights.

History 
Initially, Hillcrest was a chaparral-covered mesa. Kumeyaay Indians inhabited numerous villages scattered throughout the San Diego region. Spanish colonization brought the first of twenty-nine California missions with the founding of the nearby San Diego Mission. Presidio Park in Mission Hills and Old Town just down the hill are a part of San Diego history.

In 1870, Mary Kearney obtained a deed from the city for the land that eventually became Hillcrest. In 1871 Arnold and D. Choate, two real estate developers, obtained that property. George Hill, a wealthy railroad tycoon, then purchased the land. Real estate development began in 1910 and the area was built out by 1920. During the 1920s and 1930s Hillcrest was considered a suburban shopping area for downtown San Diego.

In the 1910s, Hillcrest became one of the many San Diego neighborhoods connected by the Class 1 streetcars and an extensive San Diego public transit system that was spurred by the Panama-California Exposition of 1915 and built by John D. Spreckels. These streetcars became a fixture of this neighborhood until their retirement in 1939.

In 1940 the "HILLCREST" lighted sign at the intersection of University and Fifth Avenue was first erected, donated by the Hillcrest Women's Association, a group of local female shopkeepers. A similar sign appears in images dated c.1930. After falling into disrepair, it was taken down and rebuilt in 1984. The sign was retrofitted in 2023 from white to color lighting in 16 million hues with pre-programmed shows for various events and holidays. The sign was relit on February 21, 2023 in the purple, gold, and green colors to celebrate Mardi Gras.

After World War II, Hillcrest was left with an aging infrastructure and population.

During the 1970s, gays and lesbians began to establish residences, businesses, and organizations in Hillcrest.

Notable events 

 1974: Protesting the city's refusal of a parade permit, 200 gays and lesbians marched through the streets of downtown for the first time.
 1975: The first city-permitted gay pride parade was held.
 1980: The Center for Social Services, founded in Golden Hill in 1973—now called the Lesbian, Gay, Bisexual, and Transgender Community Center, and generally known as "the Center"—moved to Hillcrest.
 1984: The Hillcrest Business Association, a business improvement district, was formed.
 1985: The Hillcrest Business Association hosted the first CityFest.
 1994: A new Vermont Street pedestrian bridge was completed. The span, featuring public art, cost $1.2 million.
 2001: Mercy Garden, formerly the Sisters of Mercy Convent, was remodeled for use by the HIV-positive community.
 2007: On August 2, yearlong centennial events were held, including a 100th birthday cake served to the public on August 2 and a champagne gala at The Prado's Grand Ballroom in October.
 2007: The Hillcrest Town Council was formed to give residents a voice.
 2012: The city approved plans for a large, privately funded rainbow flag at the corner of University Avenue and Normal Street. The city also approved a change in a street name from Blaine Avenue to Harvey Milk Street.
 2019: On February 12, a man fired more than a dozen shots into the Golden Dragon Asian Bistro on University Avenue near the Hillcrest sign. No one was injured. Stefano Markell Parker was judged not fit to stand trial for thirteen counts of premeditated murder. He was sentenced to two years psychiatric treatment at Patton State Hospital. 
 2020: In January, a rainbow crosswalk was unveiled at the intersection of Normal and University.
 2022: The Hillcrest Community Foundation began raising funds in July to renovate the Hillcrest Sign as its components had started to degrade and the foundation determined that "the entire sign needs to be renovated".
 2023: The Hillcrest Sign was taken down on January 31 so it could be repaired.

Demographics
The 2000 Census showed that the neighborhood's residents had a median age of 39 and that 49.3% had college degrees.

The 2000 Census indicates median family income in 1999 was $61,741 ($80,011 in 2010 inflation adjusted dollars).

The government does not record sexual orientation, but in the 2000 census, of the ~10% of households headed by unmarried couples in Hillcrest (zip code 92103), 43% were headed by two people of the same sex, an indication that they may be gay or lesbian couples. That indicates that more than 4% of all households in Hillcrest are headed by two unmarried people of the same sex.

Government
The neighborhood is governed by the elected officials of the city of San Diego. It is part of the San Diego City Council's Third district; the current councilmember is Stephen Whitburn, who replaced Chris Ward in the 2020 election as Ward moved to the California State Assembly. Ward previously replaced Todd Gloria in the Third District seat when Gloria was elected to the Assembly seat now held by Ward in 2016. This makes Stephen Whitburn the fifth consecutively elected openly LGBT representative of District 3 since the election of Chris Kehoe in 1993.

The Uptown Planners is an elected planning group composed of residents, property owners, and business people from the Uptown area, which includes Hillcrest; it advises the city on land use and other issues.

An ad hoc town council provides a conduit for information from citizens with the government. The Hillcrest Town Council is an organization of local residents that was formed in 2007. It meets monthly. Its mission statement is "To provide a voice & enhance the quality of life for Hillcrest renters & homeowners while supporting actions that benefit our neighborhood."

Economy
The Hillcrest Business Association has existed since 1921; in 1984 it became a city-approved Business Improvement District. The association supports most beautification projects in the neighborhood, stewards the iconic Hillcrest sign, organizes street festivals, runs the Hillcrest Farmers Market, and it sponsors the annual "Taste of Hillcrest," which offers food and drink samples from over 50 local bars and restaurants.

In 2012 the Hillcrest Business Association, with the support of many business people, created the HIllcrest Pride Flag.

The commercial area of Hillcrest is noted for its many restaurants. Scripps Mercy Hospital and the UC San Diego Medical Center are located here.

Transportation 
Hillcrest is a very walkable  neighborhood with cafés, restaurants, and shops near the main residential pockets.

Hillcrest is served by State Route 163 at the University Avenue, Washington Street and Robinson Avenue exits. University Avenue and Washington Street are the major east–west thoroughfares in Hillcrest; Fourth, Fifth and Sixth Avenues connect Hillcrest to Downtown San Diego through Park West and Bankers Hill. There is bus service connecting to Downtown as well as to the Mission Valley trolley stops.

Parking
Parking is a major concern in the Hillcrest area. The parking shortage is so acute that the opening of a new 36-space parking lot in June 2010 was front-page news. In an attempt to deal with the parking shortage in Hillcrest, as well as Mission Hills, Bankers Hill, and other uptown areas, the city council in 1997 created a community parking district. It was initially managed by a local nonprofit organization called the Uptown Partnership, which received a portion of the income from area parking meters, amounting to about $700,000 per year. The money was supposed to be used to improve parking availability, traffic circulation, transit effectiveness, and pedestrian mobility. After 12 years and $2.5 million, the Partnership had created only 50 new parking spaces, leading to criticism from a county Grand Jury and calls from the community to abolish it. The Uptown Partnership withdrew from managing the parking district in 2010.

After several years of inactivity, during which revenue was collected but not spent, the Uptown Community Parking District was revived in 2012 with a new board of directors and a new operations manager. In 2013 the parking district introduced a free trolley that runs along main streets on Thursday, Friday and Saturday evenings. There is also a website, AccessHillcrest, which helps people find parking spaces, share rides, or bicycle.

Hillcrest has been traditionally governed by the 1988 zoning plan, restricting high rise buildings within its boundaries. Recently the city planners have revisited this issue, and is moving forward to allow more high density buildings but also have restrictions that parking must be increased and also emphasize first level retail to any residential building. Although this will add to the density of the neighborhood, additional parking would be helpful if made available to the public.

Culture
Hillcrest "CityFest" is an annual street festival which features food, live entertainment, a beer garden and street vendors.

Other regular events in Hillcrest include a weekly farmers market on the grounds of the local Department of Motor Vehicles, a Book Fair and Mardi Gras.

Pride Festival 

San Diego Pride is an annual celebration each July for the lesbian, gay, bisexual and transgender (LGBT) community. It features the Pride Parade on a Saturday morning, preceded by the Hillcrest Block Party on Friday night and followed by a two-day festival in Balboa Park. It is sponsored by San Diego LGBT Pride and is considered to be the largest civic event in the city of San Diego. The large rainbow flag approved in May 2012 was erected in time for the 2012 Pride Festival.

References

External links 

 Hillcrest Business Association 1921-2012
 Hillcrest Farmers Market
 Hillcrest Centennial 1907-2007
 The Hillcrest Town Council
 History of Hillcrest

LGBT culture in San Diego
Neighborhoods in San Diego
Gay villages in California
Urban communities in San Diego
Restaurant districts and streets in the United States